Scouting has a growing tradition in Botswana. The Scout and Guide movement in Botswana is served by
 Botswana Girl Guides Association, member of the World Association of Girl Guides and Girl Scouts
 The Botswana Scouts Association, member of the World Organization of the Scout Movement

See also